HR 4986 may refer to:

 HD 114780 a star in Virgo, see List of stars in Virgo
 National Defense Authorization Act for Fiscal Year 2008 (110th USA Congress House Resolution 4986)

References